José Marcelo Ferreira Marques (born 31 August 1998) is a Portuguese professional footballer who plays as a forward for Anadia.

Professional career
Marcelo made his professional debut with Marítimo in a 3-0 Primeira Liga loss to Paços de Ferreira on 24 January 2021.

References

External links
 
 Fora de Jogo Profile
 Marítimo Profile

1998 births
Sportspeople from Funchal
Living people
Portuguese footballers
Association football wingers
C.S. Marítimo players
U.D. Oliveirense players
Anadia F.C. players
Primeira Liga players
Liga Portugal 2 players
Campeonato de Portugal (league) players